Martin Gernát (born 11 April 1993) is a Slovak professional ice hockey defenceman for Lausanne HC of the National League (NL).

Career
Gernát was drafted in the fifth round, 122nd overall, by the Edmonton Oilers in the 2011 NHL Entry Draft. After his draft selection, he would spend two seasons in the junior Western Hockey League with the Edmonton Oil Kings before signing a three-year entry level contract with the Oilers on April 20, 2013. He spent the next three seasons playing in the American Hockey League for the Oklahoma City Barons and the Bakersfield Condors before he was traded to the Anaheim Ducks on February 29, 2016 for Patrick Maroon. He would play just five games for the Ducks' AHL affiliate the San Diego Gulls before signing for HC Sparta Praha for the 2016-17 season. Gernát broke his contract with Sparta Praha in July 2017.

International play
Gernát was selected to play for Slovakia at the 2012 World Junior Championships.

Career statistics

Regular season and playoffs

International

References

External links

WHL Player Profile

1993 births
Living people
Slovak ice hockey defencemen
Sportspeople from Košice
Edmonton Oilers draft picks
HC Košice players
Edmonton Oil Kings players
Oklahoma City Barons players
Bakersfield Condors (1998–2015) players
Bakersfield Condors players
San Diego Gulls (AHL) players
HC Sparta Praha players
HC Prešov players
Lausanne HC players
HC Oceláři Třinec players
Ice hockey players at the 2022 Winter Olympics
Olympic ice hockey players of Slovakia
Medalists at the 2022 Winter Olympics
Olympic bronze medalists for Slovakia
Olympic medalists in ice hockey
Slovak expatriate ice hockey players in Canada
Slovak expatriate ice hockey players in the United States
Slovak expatriate ice hockey players in the Czech Republic
Slovak expatriate ice hockey players in Switzerland